Stefan Toshev (18 December 1859 – 27 November 1924) was a Bulgarian general, from World War I. His mother was a teacher from the period of the National Revival. He volunteered in the Bulgarian Opalchentsi Corps during the Russo-Turkish War (1877–1878) and later served as a translator. On 10 May 1879, he graduated from the Military School in Sofia in its first year. Then he served in the Police force of Eastern Rumelia.

Serbo-Bulgarian War (1885) 

During the Serbo-Bulgarian War in 1885 Stefan Toshev was a commander of 2nd company of the 3rd Vidin Regiment, and was in charge of the Tran position. He took part in the battle of Slivnitsa, the fight at Tran (3 November), the repulse of the Serbian Morava Division. He fought bravely in the battle of Tri Ushi and the attack of Meka tsrav (7 November). He was awarded with Order For Bravery 4th Class.

Later Toshev was in command of the 1st Sofia Infantry Regiment and in 1908 was appointed as a commander of the 1st Sofia Infantry Division, also known as the Iron division.

Balkan Wars (1912-1913) 

During the First Balkan War (1912–1913) Stefan Toshev and his division took part in the offensive of the Bulgarian Army in the Thracian theatre of operation. He participated in the engagements of Gechkenli and Seliolu during the battle of Kirk Kilisse and the attack at Chataldzha. On 5 August 1913 he was promoted Lieutenant General.

During the Second Balkan War he was in command of the 5th Army which successfully fought against the Serbs.

First World War (1914-1918) 

During the Bulgarian participation in World War I (1915–1918) General Toshev was in charge of the 3rd Army which routed the Russian-Romanian Army in the Dobruja campaign defeating it in the battles at Tutrakan, Dobrich and Cobadin, but after serious conflicts with the German General August von Mackensen he was replaced with General Stefan Nerezov. Toshev was appointed governor of Macedonia. On 25 March 1917 he was promoted General of the Infantry - the highest military post in Bulgaria. 

In 1918 Toshev commanded 4th Army and from June 1919 went into the reserve. Between 1923-1924 he was a chairman of the "Association of the reserve officers". In October 1923 he led the "Narodna Priznatelnost" committee whose aim was to make assistance for the victims of the Communist insurgents during the September Uprising.

General Stefan Toshev died on 27 November 1924 in Plovdiv and was buried in Sofia. One town (General Toshevo) and a village are named after him.

References 
 Недев, С., Командването на българската войска през войните за национално обединение, София, 1993, с. 122-123
 Вазов, В., Животописни бележки, София, 1992, Военноиздателски комплекс „Св. Георги Победоносец“, с. 123
 Димитров, И., Съединението 1885 - енциклопедичен справочник, София, 1985, Държавно издателство „д-р Петър Берон“
 Born a victor, a knight of honour

Footnotes 

1859 births
1924 deaths
Bulgarian generals
Military personnel of the Russo-Turkish War (1877–1878)
People of the Serbo-Bulgarian War
Bulgarian military personnel of World War I
Bulgarian military personnel of the Balkan Wars
Recipients of the Order of Bravery
Recipients of the Order of Military Merit (Bulgaria)
Recipients of the Liakat Medal
Recipients of the Imtiyaz Medal
People from Stara Zagora